Uraman or Owraman or Ooraman may refer to:
 Uraman Takht, a village
 Uraman District, an administrative subdivision